Tutuum Yohl Kʼinich (c. 455) was the second known king of Maya city-state Quiriguá in Guatemala.

He was named after the Sun god, Kinich Ahau.

It is recorded that a stela, as yet undiscovered, was erected in 455 by Tutuum Yohl Kʼinich.

Notes

References

Kings of Quiriguá
5th century in Guatemala